The McGown Lakes are a series of seven small alpine glacial lakes in Custer County, Idaho, United States, located in the Sawtooth Mountains in the Sawtooth National Recreation Area.  The lakes are in the Stanley Lake Creek watershed and can be accessed from Sawtooth National Forest trail 640.

The McGown Lakes are in the Sawtooth Wilderness, and a wilderness permit can be obtained at a registration box at trailheads or wilderness boundaries.  Sawtooth Lake is located to the east of the McGown Lakes, although in a separate watershed.

References

See also

 List of lakes of the Sawtooth Mountains (Idaho)
 Sawtooth National Forest
 Sawtooth National Recreation Area
 Sawtooth Range (Idaho)

Lakes of Idaho
Lakes of Custer County, Idaho
Glacial lakes of the United States
Glacial lakes of the Sawtooth Wilderness